XX (pronounced Double X) is a compilation album by American metal band Mushroomhead, released in 2001. It was originally released  through Eclipse Records, where Mushroomhead took classic tracks and remixed them. XX was later re-released on Universal Records in December of the same year. XX contains tracks from the band's three independently released albums – Mushroomhead, Superbuick and M3.

Being the first ever Mushroomhead album released on a major label, XXs re-release on Universal Records introduced Mushroomhead on a national and international level, while previously being just a regionally-known band. The album has sold over 300,000 copies. Musically, the album is primarily within the genres of industrial metal, nu metal and alternative metal with a diverse influence from genres such as gothic rock, punk rock, techno, and hip hop.

Difference between versions
Compared to the Universal Records release, the Eclipse Records version contains clearer production that's more faithful to the original albums, a different track listing and a hidden prank call at the end of "Bwomp" extended mix.

Music videos
"Solitaire Unraveling" is the only song from the album to have a music video produced, which was directed by Dean Karr. The video is set in a Southern California airplane hangar and shows the band in specially designed masks. According to J Mann, the song "acts as a metaphor for the cycles of life and the duality of man". Drummer and founding member Skinny adds, "It's very much us: dark, creepy, surreal."
It found airplay on Uranium, Kerrang! TV, MTV2, and MTV2 Europe.

Track listing

 "Empty Spaces" was the only song, on the album, with Richard "St1tch" Thomas.

Personnel
 Steve Felton – producer
 Mushroomhead – producer
 Bill Korecky – engineer, mixer (Eclipse version)
 Pat Lewis – engineer
 Scot Edgell – additional vocals (track 9)
 Toby Wright – mixer (Universal version)
 Elliott Blakey – mix assistant
 Steven Marcussen – mastering (Universal version)
 Vanessa Solowiow – photos, layout and design

Reception
CMJ (4/30/01, p. 17) - "Employs piano, clean vocals, and strong song structures; and beckons more to Faith No More ca. King for a Day or Fool for a Lifetime."

Charts

References

External links
View the lyrics to this album at Mushroomhead.com

Mushroomhead albums
2001 albums
Universal Records albums
2001 compilation albums
Universal Records compilation albums